Cuthbert Goes Walkabout is a maze video game written by Steve Bak for the Dragon 32/64 and published by Microdeal in 1983. A TRS-80 Color Computer port was released the same year. Atari 8-bit family and Commodore 64 versions followed in 1984. The game features the character Cuthbert (who also appeared in Cuthbert Goes Digging, Cuthbert in Space, Cuthbert in the Jungle and Cuthbert in the Mines). The game is based on the Konami arcade game Amidar.

Gameplay
The player guides Cuthbert around a grid-like level of squares. If all the squares are filled, and Cuthbert successfully avoids the monsters and finishes before the time runs out, the player progresses to the next level.

References

1983 video games
Dragon 32 games
TRS-80 Color Computer games
Commodore 64 games
Atari 8-bit family games
Maze games
Video games developed in the United Kingdom
Video game clones